Gordon Watkinson (born in 1964 in Charlottesville, Virginia, United States) is an American visual artist whose work has a strong focus on architecture and design. Fascinated by forms, structures and materials Watkinson explores the role of architecture and design as life changing tools, while revisiting both visually and conceptually major architectural shifts from a contemporary perspective, with a particular emphasis on the modernist era.

Early Beginning 

Watkinson discovered photography accidentally while studying at Virginia Commonwealth University in Richmond, Virginia. Watkinson borrowed a camera for a photography class he took at the age of 24. Although he had not thought of photography in a serious way, after completing the course his professor saw enough in his work that he encouraged Watkinson to reconsider his career choice and arrange for him to begin working as a photographic assistant.

Work 

Inspired by a visit to the Bauhaus school in Dessau, Germany in the 1990s Gordon Watkinson created the large-scale traveling exhibition Bauhaus twenty-21: An Ongoing Legacy, featuring the work of Bauhaus masters and students Marcel Breuer, Walter Gropius, Hannes Meyer, Ludwig Mies van der Rohe, Georg Muche, and Richard Paulick in dialogue with early 21st century's buildings by established as well as internationally renowned architects such as RCR, Sauerbruch Hutton, Werner Sobek or Gert Wingårdh. Presented under the patronage of UNESCO the exhibition opened at the German Architecture Museum in Frankfurt, Germany in March 2009, commemorating the 90th anniversary of the Bauhaus. Since then it has been touring  extensively throughout Europe (Kraków, Nice, Munich, Stockholm, Ljubljana, Bratislava, Brussels, Eindhoven, Tampere) and is currently touring in the US. Watkinson's contemporary work documents 12 of the most significant examples of Bauhaus architecture in more than 100 photographs. Watkinson’s images are accompanied by a selection of digitized, historic blueprints and sketches that illustrate the buildings’ innovative design characteristics and construction techniques. Presented alongside each of the Bauhaus selections are comparative projects by renowned contemporary architects, which make clear the ongoing legacy of Bauhaus principles in 21st-century international practice. Honoring the fact that architectural design is best understood experientially, and not simply through the eyes, the exhibition, Bauhaus twenty-21 also includes room-like settings of Bauhaus-design furniture and objects, inviting visitors to interact physically with distinctive environments expressed by these seminal early 20th-century designs.

Watkinson is also known for commercial photography in the fields of advertising, architecture, design and fashion for clients such as the Spiegel catalog and Texas Instruments. In conjunction with his photographic work, he has directed commercials, and industrial videos. In Watkinson's work a strong sense of both forms and materials becomes apparent, as well as his appreciation for timeless and minimalist design.

Watkinson's singular vision of architecture, with its particular emphasis on frontal views and abstract forms as well as on the materiality of the structures, has shaped an important body of work photographing architecture and design, including buildings and objects by Marcel Breuer, Eileen Gray, Le Corbusier, Jacobus Oud, Jean Prouvé, and also sculpture, more particularly the work of Auguste Rodin.

Watkinson's work has been published in The Dallas Morning News (US), ELLE Decoration (Germany), Frankfurter Allgemeine Zeitung (Germany), Numéro (France), Le Point (France), PHOTO International (Germany), Süddeutsche Zeitung-Magazin (Germany).

Watkinson regularly lectures and gives workshops in museums and universities both in Europe and in the US, most recently at the National Museum of Art, Architecture and Design in Oslo (Norway), at the Bauhaus University in Weimar (Germany), at Mississippi State University and at the University of Memphis.

Exhibitions 

 2016 – Bauhaus twenty-21: An Ongoing Legacy, Palm Springs Art Museum, Palm Springs (CA) / USA
 2014 – Bauhaus twenty-21: An Ongoing Legacy, Price Tower Arts Center, Bartlesville (OK) / USA
 2013 – Bauhaus twenty-21: An Ongoing Legacy, Art Museum of the University of Memphis, Memphis (TN) / USA
 2013 – Bauhaus twenty-21: An Ongoing Legacy, Arkansas Arts Center, Little Rock (AR) / USA 
 2013 – Bauhaus twenty-21: An Ongoing Legacy, Jule Collins Smith Museum of Fine Art, Auburn University, Auburn (AL) / USA
 2013 – Bauhaus twenty-21: An Ongoing Legacy, Tampere Art Museum, Tampere / Finland
 2012 – Bauhaus twenty-21: An Ongoing Legacy, Yksi Expo, Eindhoven / The Netherlands
 2011 – Bauhaus twenty-21: An Ongoing Legacy, CIVA Centre International pour la Ville, l’Architecture et le Paysage, Brussels / Belgium
 2011 – Bauhaus twenty-21: An Ongoing Legacy, design factory, Bratislava / Slovakia
 2010 – Bauhaus twenty-21: An Ongoing Legacy, Jacopic Gallery, Ljubljana / Slovenia
 2010 – Bauhaus twenty-21: An Ongoing Legacy, Nordbygg, Nordic Building & Construction Fair, Stockholm / Sweden
 2010 – Bauhaus twenty-21: An Ongoing Legacy, Haus der Gegenwart, Munich / Germany
 2009 – Bauhaus twenty-21: An Ongoing Legacy, Forum d’Urbanisme et d’Architecture, Nice / France
 2009 – Bauhaus twenty-21: An Ongoing Legacy, International Cultural Center Kraków, Kraków / Poland
 2009 – Bauhaus twenty-21: An Ongoing Legacy, German Architecture Museum (Deutsches Architekturmuseum), Frankfurt / Germany

Books 

 Bauhaus twenty-21. An Ongoing Legacy. With texts by Falk Jaeger and Peter Cachola Schmal, as well as contributions by Michael Siebenbrodt and twelve prominent architects.  140 duotone photographs and 60 line drawings . Basel: Birkhäuser, 2009
 Bauhaus zwanzig-21. Ideen für ein neues Jahrhundert. Mit Essays von Falk Jaeger und Peter Cachola Schmal sowie Beiträgen von Michael Siebenbrodt und zwölf prominenten Architekten. 140 Duotone Fotografien und 60 Zeichnungen. Basel: Birkhäuser, 2009
 Bauhaus XX-XXI. Dziedzictwo wciąż żywe. Cracow: International Cultural Centre, 2009

References 

 Peter Cachola Schmal, "From Bauhaus to Your House" in Gordon Watkinson: Bauhaus twenty-21: An Ongoing Legacy, Basel: Birkhäuser, 2009. p. 12-14
 Jan Niklas Kocks, “Die Kamera schärft den Blick. Gordon Watkinson fotografiert mit Schülern Frankfurter Architektur”, Frankfurter Rundschau, March 13, 2009
 Bauhaus twenty-21: An Ongoing Legacy. An interview with Gordon Watkinson, JAM, April–May 2009
 Hans-Michael Koetzle, "Zwischen Konzeptkunst und Architekturkritik", PHOTO International, May 2009
 Sandra Hofmeister, Bauhaus in unser Haus. Gordon Watkinson "Bauhaus twenty-21" im Haus der Gegenwart in München, Baumeister #4/2010
 Jean-Lucien Bocillo & Jean-François Pousse, L'Architecture contemporaine sur la Côte d'Azur, Dijon: Les Presses du Réel, 2011. p. 32-33
 Louisa Curtis is in the ChatterCorner with Gordon Watkinson, PDN Online, May 2, 2012
 Phyllis Richardson, Skywood House. And the Architecture of Graham Phillips, London: Thames & Hudson, 2014
 , Auburn University, Jule Collins Smith Museum of Fine Art, 2013

External links 
 www.gordonwatkinson.com

Notes 

1964 births
Living people
Photographers from Virginia